Donizete Francisco de Oliveira (born February 21, 1968 in Bauru, Brazil), sometimes known as just Donizete, is a former Brazilian football player.

Club statistics

National team statistics

External links

External links

1968 births
Living people
Brazilian footballers
Fluminense FC players
Grêmio Foot-Ball Porto Alegrense players
Clube Atlético Bragantino players
São Paulo FC players
Cruzeiro Esporte Clube players
Esporte Clube Vitória players
Sporting Cristal footballers
Urawa Red Diamonds players
CR Vasco da Gama players
Brazilian expatriate footballers
Expatriate footballers in Japan
Campeonato Brasileiro Série A players
J1 League players
Brazil international footballers
Association football midfielders
People from Bauru
Footballers from São Paulo (state)